Molla Fazle Akbar was a three-star rank Bangladesh Army officer. A Lieutenant General and the former Director General of Directorate General of Forces Intelligence. After retirement he served as the Chief advisor of Regent Airways, Bangladesh operating in domestic and international routes and the chairman of the board of directors of a financial institute, Bangladesh Industrial Finance Company Limited (BIFC) as well as Vice Chairman of the board of directors of a commercial Bank, Union Bank Limited.

Education
Akbar earned Bachelor of Science degree in war studies from Baluchistan University, Pakistan and obtained Bachelor of Arts degree from University of Dhaka, Bangladesh. He completed Masters in Social Studies (MSS) in political science from University of Dhaka and Masters of Business Administration (MBA) from North South University, Dhaka. He earned his Masters of Philosophy (M.Phil.) from National University of Bangladesh. At present he is pursuing Ph.D as research fellow of Bangladesh University of Professional (BUP), Dhaka.

He attended a number of military courses both at home and abroad. He completed his Anti Aircraft Firing Drone Course from China and Security Intelligence Administration Course from United Kingdom. He is a graduate of Army Command and Staff College, Quetta, Pakistan. He is also a graduate of National Defence College, Bangladesh.

Career

Military 
He was commissioned in the Corps of Artillery, Bangladesh Army on 30 November 1976.

As staff he worked as the Brigade Major of two infantry brigades, Staff Officer in Directorate General of Forces Intelligence (DGFI), Grade One Staff Officer (Training & Operations) in an Infantry Division, Assistant Defence Adviser at Bangladesh High Commission in India and Colonel Staff in an infantry division. He also performed as Director of Military Operations and Director of Artillery in General Staff Branch, Army Headquarters.

Akbar commanded an air defence artillery regiment. He also commanded an air defence artillery brigade (ADA) of the Bangladesh Army and a field artillery brigade. He also commanded a sector of the then Bangladesh Rifles (BDR) presently known as Border Guard Bangladesh (BGB).

He was made the Director General of Directorate General of Forces Intelligence in 2009. In 2010 he was promoted to Lieutenant General. Making him one of the four officers of that rank in Bangladesh army at that time. He improved cooperation with India and the US during his tenure as Director General. He also focused agency resources on counter-terrorism operations.

In his last assignment he served as the Commandant of National Defence College (NDC). General Akbar was the 'Colonel Commandant of the Regiment of Artillery' of Bangladesh Army from March 2010 to February 2015. He went to retirement on 16 February 2016.

UN Mission 
He was also the first sector commander of Bangladesh sector in Liberia, UNMIL (United Nations Mission in Liberia) where he inducted and commanded a brigade group force.

References

Living people
Bangladesh Army generals
Year of birth missing (living people)
North South University alumni
University of Dhaka alumni
Bangladesh University of Professionals alumni